Mark Van Doren (June 13, 1894 – December 10, 1972) was an American poet, writer and critic.  He was a scholar and a professor of English at Columbia University for nearly 40 years, where he inspired a generation of influential writers and thinkers including Thomas Merton, Robert Lax, John Berryman,  Whittaker Chambers, and Beat Generation writers such as Allen Ginsberg and Jack Kerouac. He was literary editor of The Nation, in New York City (1924–1928), and its film critic, 1935 to 1938.

He won the 1940 Pulitzer Prize for Poetry for Collected Poems 1922–1938. Amongst his other notable works, many published in The Kenyon Review, include a collaboration with brother Carl Van Doren, American and British Literature since 1890 (1939); critical studies, The Poetry of John Dryden (1920), Shakespeare (1939), The Noble Voice (1945) and Nathaniel Hawthorne (1949); collections of poems including Jonathan Gentry (1931); stories; and the verse play The Last Days of Lincoln (1959).

Early life and education
Van Doren was born in Vermilion County, Illinois, the fourth of five sons of the county's doctor, Charles Lucius Van Doren, of remote Dutch ancestry, and wife Eudora Ann Butz. He was raised on his family's farm in eastern Illinois, before his father decided to move to the neighboring town of Urbana, to be closer to good schools.

He was the younger brother of the academic and biographer Carl Van Doren, starting with whom all five brothers attended the local elementary school and high school. Mark Van Doren eventually studied at the University of Illinois in Urbana, where he earned a B.A. in 1914. In 1920, he earned a Ph.D. from what became the Columbia Graduate School of Arts and Sciences at Columbia University, while also a member of the Boar's Head Society, a student society at the university devoted to poetry.

Career

Van Doren joined the Columbia University faculty in 1920, having been preceded by his brother Carl. Mark Van Doren went on to become one of Columbia's  greatest teachers and a "legendary classroom presence"; he became a full professor in 1942, and taught English until 1959, at which point he became Professor Emeritus until his death in 1972. His students at Columbia included the poets and writers John Berryman, Allen Ginsberg, Jack Kerouac, Louis Simpson, Richard Howard, Lionel Trilling (later a colleague), Robert Lax, Anthony Robinson, as well as the Japanologist and interpreter of Japanese literature Donald Keene, author and activist Whittaker Chambers, writer and Trappist monk Thomas Merton, Walter B. Pitkin Jr. and poet-critic John Hollander.

He twice served on the staff of The Nation from 1924–1928 and again from 1935–1938. He was a member of the Society for the Prevention of World War III.

In 1940, he was awarded the Pulitzer Prize for Poetry for Collected Poems 1922–1938. This came only a year after his elder brother Carl had won the Pulitzer Prize for Biography or Autobiography for Benjamin Franklin. Van Doren helped Ginsberg avoid jail time in June 1949 by testifying on his behalf when Ginsberg was arrested as an accessory to crimes carried out by Herbert Huncke and others, and was an important influence on Merton, both in Merton's conversion to Catholicism and Merton's poetry.  He was a strong advocate of liberal education, and wrote the book, Liberal Education (1943), which helped promote the influential "great books" movement. Starting in 1941, he also did Invitation to Learning, a CBS Radio show, where as one of the experts he discussed great literature.

He was made a Fellow in American Letters of the Library of Congress and also remained president of the American Academy of Arts and Letters.

Personal life
In 1922 Mark Van Doren married Dorothy Graffe, novelist and writer of the memoir The Professor and I (1959), whom he had earlier met at The Nation. His successful book, Anthology of World Poetry, enabled the couple to buy a house on Bleecker Street in New York City in February 1929, before markets collapsed.

Their son, Charles Van Doren (February 12, 1926 - April 9, 2019), briefly achieved renown as the winner of the rigged game show Twenty-One. In the film Quiz Show (1994), Mark Van Doren was played by Paul Scofield, who earned an Academy Award nomination in the Best Supporting Actor category for his performance. Their second son is John Van Doren who also lives in Cornwall, Connecticut, at the farmstead where their father did most of his writing between academic years, and where he moved after retirement.

Mark Van Doren died on December 10, 1972, in Torrington, Connecticut, aged 78, two days after undergoing surgery for circulatory problems at the Charlotte Hungerford Hospital. He was interred at Cornwall Hollow Cemetery in Connecticut.

Legacy
His correspondence with Allen Tate is at Vanderbilt University. Since 1962, students of Columbia College have honored a great teacher at the school each year with the "Mark Van Doren Award".

Bibliography 
Poetry:
 Spring Thunder (1924)
 An Anthology of World Poetry (1928)
 Jonathan Gentry (1931), (Editor)
 The Oxford Book of American Prose, (OUP), (1932)
 Winter Diary (1935)
 Collected Poems 1922–1938 (1939), Winner of the 1940 Pulitzer Prize for Poetry
 The Mayfield Deer (1941)
 The Country Year (1946) William Sloane Associates, New York
 Selected poems (Holt), (1954)
 The Last Days of Lincoln, a play in six scenes (1959), a Verse Play
 Our Lady Peace
 The Story-Teller (N/A)
 Collected and New Poems 1924–1963 (1963)
 
 That Shining Place: New Poems (1969) Hall and Wang
Novels:
 The Transients (1935)
 Windless Cabins (1940)
 Tilda (1943)

Short story collection
 Nobody Say a Word (1954)

Nonfiction:
 Henry David Thoreau: A Critical Study (1916)
 The Poetry of John Dryden (1920)
 Introduction to Bartram's Travels (1928)
 An Autobiography of America, (A. & C. Boni))1929)
 American poets, 1630-1930 (Little, Brown), (1932)
 American and British Literature Since 1890 (1939), with Carl Van Doren
 Shakespeare (1939)
 The Liberal Education (1943)
 The night of the summer solstice: & other stories of the Russian war, (Henry Holt and Company), (1943)
 The Noble Voice (1946)
 Nathaniel Hawthorne (1949)
 Introduction to Poetry (1951)
 The Autobiography Of Mark Van Doren (1958)
 The Happy Critic (1961)
  
 
 
 
 

Discography:
 Mark Van Doren Reads from His Collected and New Poems (Folkways Records, 1967)

Quotes
 "The literature of the world has exerted its power by being translated."

References

Further reading 
 The Essays of Mark Van Doren: (1924-1972) Selected, with an Introduction by William Claire. Westport, Conn.: Greenwood Press.
 Mark Van Doren, by J. T. Ledbetter. Peter Lang, 1996. .
 Sonnets by Mark Van Doren

External links 

 Mark Van Doren, Biography and Poems at Poetry Foundation
 Mark Van Doren and Shakespeare; Columbia College Today, September 2005 (retrieved May 24, 2009)
 Mark Van Doren & American classicism. Free Library
 
Finding aid to William F. Claire collection on Mark van Doren at Columbia University. Rare Book & Manuscript Library.
Finding aid to Robert N. Caldwell Correspondence with Mark van Doren at Columbia University. Rare Book & Manuscript Library.

1894 births
1972 deaths
American male poets
American autobiographers
American film critics
American literary editors
American people of Dutch descent
Columbia Graduate School of Arts and Sciences alumni
Columbia University faculty
American academics of English literature
People from Vermilion County, Illinois
Pulitzer Prize for Poetry winners
The Nation (U.S. magazine) people
University of Illinois Urbana-Champaign alumni
Mark Van Doren
20th-century American poets
20th-century American male writers
20th-century American non-fiction writers
American male non-fiction writers
Writers from Illinois
Presidents of the American Academy of Arts and Letters